Gentile Zanardi (late 17th century) was an Italian painter, active in the Baroque period in Bologna.

Zanardi was a disciple of Marcantonio Franceschini. Giovanni Paolo Zanardi (active 1658–1669) was Gentile's brother. Her father Giulio (1639–1694) was also a Bolognese painter. She married Sebastiano Monci, a quadratura painter who had been a pupil of Agostino Metelli Senior.

References

Year of birth unknown
Year of death unknown
People from the Province of Bologna
17th-century Italian painters
Painters from Bologna
Italian Baroque painters
Italian women painters
17th-century Italian women artists
18th-century Italian women artists